Rara Sahib is a village near Ludhiana city in Punjab, India. This village was transformed from simple Rara to Rara Sahib due to the visit by the sixth Sikh Guru, Guru Hargobind Ji.

Rara Sahib is located 22 km south-east of Ludhiana, 14 km north-east of Ahmedgarh and 22 km north-west of Khanna. It lies on the Chawa-Payal-Ahmedgarh road and is situated on the bank of Bathinda branch of the Sirhind Canal.

The village has become famous in recent times because of the dedication of Sant Isher Singh Ji and Sant Kishan Singh Ji. On the request of Sardar Gian Singh Rarewala, they had stayed in the village Rara Sahib and had made this desolate place their abode. Subsequently, a huge Gurdwara complex known as Gurdwara Karamsar was built besides this village.

References

External links
 Gurdwara Karamsar, Rara Sahib
 Wikimapia link

Cities and towns in Ludhiana district